School District 52 Prince Rupert is a school district in British Columbia, serving the communities of Prince Rupert, Port Edward, Metlakatla, and Hartley Bay (the Gitga’at First Nation), which are within the territory of the Ts’msyen Nation.

The school district offers a school-based Sm'álgyax language program to enhance the cultural identity and school achievement of aboriginal students.
The district's office of First Nation Educational Services has gained a reputation for leading the establishment of academic credibility with respect to First Nations inclusion.

Water 
On January 20, 2020, Northern Health had the district discontinue the use of school drinking fountains. Accordingly, the district distributes bottled water.

History 
Prince Rupert is a port city on British Columbia's northwest coast. It's a gateway to wilderness areas like the Khutzeymateen Grizzly Sanctuary bear habitat. Shops and cafes dot the waterfront Cow Bay area. The Museum of Northern B.C. showcases the region's natural and cultural heritage. South, the North Pacific Cannery traces the city's salmon-canning history. Humpback whales swim in the fish-filled waters offshore.
Weather: 15 °C, Wind S at 8 km/h, 75% Humidity
Population: 12,508 (2011)
Regional District: Skeena-Queen Charlotte

Schools

See also 
 List of school districts in British Columbia

References

External links 
 
 Aboriginal Education SD52
 Prince Rupert District Teachers' Union website

Education in Prince Rupert, British Columbia
52
North Coast Regional District